Sue Meredith (born August 16, 1946, in St. Louis, Missouri) is an American politician who served as a member of the Missouri House of Representatives from the 71st district for three terms from 2013 to 2019.

Personal life
Sue Meredith was born in St. Louis, Missouri. She graduated from Pattonville High School in 1964 and then pursued a degree in political science from Webster University and later a master's degree in legal studies from Webster.

Career
Sue Meredith has served on Ritenour School Board, A marketing firm, PTO boards, treasurer for Midwest Dance Theatre and as an executive officer of Olivette Chamber of Comerence.

Since January 2015, she has served as the chair of the  Missouri Children's Services Commission, a statutory commission composed of various Missouri department heads and two members of the Missouri House of Representatives (one from each party) and two members of the Missouri Senate (one from each party). She has served as a Court Appointed Special Advocate (CASA) advocating for children who have been removed from their homes due to abuse and neglect.

With her retirement from the General Assembly, she remains an elected official, serving as Democratic committeewoman for Creve Coeur Township.  She also intends to host issues discussions for residents in St. Louis County under the theme of Continuing the Conversation.

References

1946 births
21st-century American politicians
21st-century American women politicians
Living people
Democratic Party members of the Missouri House of Representatives
Politicians from St. Louis
Women state legislators in Missouri
School board members in Missouri